Mineral Springs is a town in Union County, North Carolina, United States. The population was 2,639 at the 2010 census.

Geography
Mineral Springs is located at  (34.937516, -80.675106).

Demographics

As of the census of 2000, there were 1,370 people, 475 households, and 387 families residing in the town. The population density was 181.2 people per square mile (70.0/km). There were 491 housing units at an average density of 64.9 per square mile (25.1/km). The racial makeup of the town was 79.93% White, 17.88% African American, 0.15% Native American, 0.22% Asian, 0.88% from other races, and 0.95% from two or more races. Hispanic or Latino of any race were 1.90% of the population.

There were 475 households, out of which 40.2% had children under the age of 18 living with them, 69.9% were married couples living together, 8.6% had a female householder with no husband present, and 18.5% were non-families. 14.9% of all households were made up of individuals, and 5.1% had someone living alone who was 65 years of age or older. The average household size was 2.88 and the average family size was 3.20.

In the town, the population was spread out, with 28.3% under the age of 18, 7.2% from 18 to 24, 32.2% from 25 to 44, 23.6% from 45 to 64, and 8.7% who were 65 years of age or older. The median age was 36 years. For every 100 females, there were 98.6 males. For every 100 females age 18 and over, there were 96.0 males.

The median income for a household in the town was $41,932, and the median income for a family was $44,531. Males had a median income of $31,581 versus $24,926 for females. The per capita income for the town was $17,896. About 3.9% of families and 4.4% of the population were below the poverty line, including 4.3% of those under age 18 and 11.1% of those age 65 or over.

Queens Cup Steeplechase Races
 Brooklandwood, is a large 260+ acre farm and estate within the Town of Mineral Springs and an adjoining 44+ acres outside of the town for a total of 305 acres. Brooklandwood is the site of the Queens Cup Steeplechase, one of steeplechase horse racing's major annual events.  The day consists of 5-6 jump races, and is held the last Saturday of every April.  The schedule of events also features a Jack Russell Terrier judging contest. 12,000-18,000 people descend on Mineral Springs from all parts of the country but primarily within the seven county region of Charlotte, to take part in this day-long event of races and other activities.

References

External links
 Official website of Mineral Springs, NC
 Queens Cup Steeplechase (official site)

Towns in North Carolina
Towns in Union County, North Carolina